The 2012 Categoría Primera B season is the 23rd season since its founding and is officially called the 2012 Torneo Postobón for sponsorship reasons.

Format
The season will consist of two tournaments: the 'Torneo Apertura' and the 'Torneo Finalización'. Each tournament will have an identical format of eighteen rounds with a round of regional derbies in the ninth round. At the end of the first eighteen rounds, the eight best-placed team will advance to the Semifinal round where teams will be sorted into groups and play a short double Round-robin tournament group stage. The winner of each group will advance to the Final round, which will consist of two legs. The winner will advance to the season final at the end of the Torneo Finalización.

Current teams

Torneo Apertura

First stage

Standings

Results

Semifinals
The Semifinal stage began on May 30 and ended on June 23. The eight teams that advanced were sorted into two groups of four teams. The winner of each group advanced to the finals.

Group A

Group B

Finals

Top goalscorers

Torneo Finalización

First stage

Standings

Results

Semifinals
The Semifinal stage began on October 20 and ended on November 18. The eight teams that advanced were sorted into two groups of four teams. The winner of each group advanced to the finals.

Group A

Group B

Finals

Top goalscorers

Final of the year

Promotion/relegation playoff
As the second worst team in the relegation table, Cúcuta Deportivo had to play a two-legged tie against América de Cali, the 2012 Categoría Primera B runner-up. As the Primera A team, Cúcuta will play the second leg at home. The winner will be determined by points, followed by goal difference, then a penalty shootout. The winner will be promoted/remain in the Primera A for the 2013 season, while the loser will be relegated/remain in the Primera B.

Aggregate table

References

Categoría Primera B seasons
2012 in Colombian football
Colombia